Professor José Ângelo Rizzo Biological Reserve is a biological reserve in the state of Goiás, Brazil.

Location

It is located in the Serra Dourada.
It is within the Serra Dourada State Park.
The reserve is surrounded by a fence, and accessible by dirt road.
It contains laboratories and housing which provide a base for researchers, students and visitors.

Environment

The reserve is of interest for its vegetation, geological formation, wildlife and scenic beauty.
The area includes slopes of the Sierra, and is well preserved. It displays cerrado characteristics, including the presence of endemic species.
Some areas are devoid of high plants and covered mostly by grass of the Vellozia and Tibouchina papyrus species.
The fauna is composed mainly of insects, birds, amphibians, reptiles and small mammals.

Notes

Sources

Biological reserves of Brazil
Protected areas of Goiás
Protected areas established in 1969
1969 establishments in Brazil
Federal University of Goiás